The 2020–21 Arminia Bielefeld season was the club's 116th season in existence and the first season back in the top flight of German football. In addition to the domestic league, Arminia Bielefeld participated in this season's edition of the DFB-Pokal. The season covered the period from 1 July 2020 to 30 June 2021.

Arminia was the team with the lowest budget in the Bundesliga. After a defeat in the first round of the DFB-Pokal they had a quite promising start in the Bundesliga season, but from the 4th matchday onwards they could be found among the last five teams in the league table, from the 6th matchday onwards amongst the last four teams. In March, the manager Uwe Neuhaus was replaced by Frank Kramer. A 2–0 win over VfB Stuttgart on the final matchday secured the 15th rank and thus their spot in the 2021–22 Bundesliga.

Players

First-team squad

Out on loan

Transfers

In

Out

Pre-season and friendlies

Competitions

Overview

Bundesliga

League table

Results summary

Results by round

Matches
The league fixtures were announced on 7 August 2020.

DFB-Pokal

Statistics

Appearances and goals

|-
! colspan=14 style=background:#dcdcdc; text-align:center| Goalkeepers

|-
! colspan=14 style=background:#dcdcdc; text-align:center| Defenders

|-
! colspan=14 style=background:#dcdcdc; text-align:center| Midfielders

|-
! colspan=14 style=background:#dcdcdc; text-align:center| Forwards

|-
! colspan=14 style=background:#dcdcdc; text-align:center| Players transferred out during the season

Goalscorers

References

External links

Arminia Bielefeld seasons
Arminia Bielefeld